The Great Siberian Ice March was the name given to the 2000-kilometer winter retreat of Admiral Kolchak's Siberian Army from Omsk to Chita, in the course of the Russian Civil War between 14 November 1919 and March 1920.

General Vladimir Kappel, who was appointed to this position in mid-December 1919, led the retreat. After his death from pneumonia on 26 January 1920, General Sergei Wojciechowski took command of the troops. Admiral Kolchak travelled ahead by train to Irkutsk but was halted by Czechoslovak troops in December and handed over to Left SR troops in Irkutsk on 14 January, who executed him on 7 February 1920.

Prelude 

In the summer of 1919, the Red Army had gained a great victory against Kolchak's Army. The White forces re-established a line along the Tobol and the Ishim rivers to temporarily halt the Red Army, which was faced by an advance on Moscow from the south by Anton Denikin's White Army. By the autumn, Denikin had been defeated and the Red Army was able to direct reinforcements back to the Eastern Front. The Reds broke through on the Tobol River in mid-October and by November the White forces were falling back towards Omsk in a disorganised mass. Omsk was conquered by the Reds on 14 November 1919.

The retreat from Omsk to Lake Baikal
The retreat began after the heavy defeats of the White Army in the Omsk operation and in the Novonikolaevsk Operation in November–December 1919. The army, led by General Kappel, retreated along the Trans-Siberian Railway, using the available trains to transport the wounded. They were followed on their heels by the 5th Red Army under the command of Genrich Eiche.

The White retreat was complicated by numerous insurgencies in the cities where they had to pass and attacks by partisan detachments, and was further aggravated by the fierce Siberian frost. After the series of defeats, the White troops were in a demoralized state, centralized supply was paralyzed, replenishment  not received, and the discipline dropped dramatically.

In these circumstances, the appointment as commander of the Army of General Kappel, who enjoyed unlimited trust and prestige amongst Kolchak's troops, was the first step to avoid the disintegration of the entire Kolchak army. Only the 2nd Army came under his command, as communication with the 1st and 3rd armies had been lost. Control of the railway was in the hands of the Czechoslovak Legion, as a result of which parts of General Kappel's Army were deprived of the opportunity to use the railway. They were also harassed by partisan troops under command of Alexander Kravchenko and Peter Efimovich Schetinkin.

The pursuing Red 5th Army took Tomsk on 20 December 1919 and Krasnoyarsk on 7 January 1920.

The march across Lake Baikal 
Kappel's 2nd Army came to a halt on the shore of Lake Baikal near Irkutsk in January 1920. With the Red Army in hot pursuit after Kappel was forced to find a route around the Communist uprising in Krasnoyarsk, the White 2nd Army (the Kappelevtsy), had to escape eastwards to Chita across the frozen Lake Baikal in sub-zero temperatures. About 30,000 White Army soldiers, their families and all their possessions as well as the Tsar's gold, made their way across the lake to Transbaikalia.

The bloodiest campaign battles occurred at the villages of Yakovlevka, Birulka, and Gruznovskaya, as well as the city of Barguzin.

As the Arctic winds blew unobstructed across the lake, many in the army and their families froze to death. Their bodies remained frozen on the lake in a kind of tableau throughout the winter of 1919–20. With the advent of spring, the frozen corpses and all their possessions disappeared in 5,000 feet of water. Kappel himself  suffered frostbite and pneumonia  in temperatures of -40 °C (-40 °F), and died on 26 January.

End of the March 
The survivors of the March found a safe haven in Chita, the capital of Eastern Okraina, a territory under control of Kolchak's successor Grigory Mikhaylovich Semyonov, who was supported by a significant Japanese military presence.

The Central Committee of the Russian Communist Party issued an order not to advance beyond Irkutsk to avoid a military conflict with Japan, at a moment when the main threat for the young Soviet State was in Europe (Poland).

Notes

Russian Civil War
History of Siberia
1920 in Russia
White movement
January 1920 events
February 1920 events